Dompierre-les-Ormes is a commune in the department of Saône-et-Loire in Bourgogne-Franche-Comté, France.

It is a rural and touristic village, with characteristic landscapes: little mountains crowded with forests and pastures. The main part of its territory is protected under French and European fauna and flora protection programs.

History

Dompierre is first mentioned in a Cluny charter from 951, where the name appears as Domnus Petrus and Domna Petra.

In 1820, the Comte de Marcellus brings the very famous Venus de Milo in France. During his journey, the precious statue made a halt at the castle Audour before being offered to King Louis XVIII.

Since 1993 Dompierre has been a member of the Association des Dompierre de France, an association of 23 French communes sharing the name.

Geography

Nestled in a picturesque wooded area, Dompierre is known locally as la petite Suisse du Mâconnais (Little Switzerland in the Mâconnais).

Points of interest
 Arboretum de Pézanin,
 La Galerie européenne de la forêt et du bois (European Gallery of Forest and Wood), with many exhibits, transformed in 2014 in The Lab 71, which is now more concerned by sustainable development.
 Mont Saint-Cyr, a 771-meter summit in the nearby village of Montmelard
 Château d'Audour
 Meulin, an ancient village with a Romanesque church

Tourism
Dompierre is a tourist destination, with campsite (Le Village des Meuniers), cottage colonies (Domaine des Monts du Mâconnais), and lot of rural gîtes and bed and breakfast in the area.

Sport
The village has a football stadium which serves for matches and training of FCDM (Football Club Dompierre-Matour), a handball and basketball stadium, pétanque courts, tennis courts and many walking trails.
Walking trails are referenced by guides and maps for tourists.
For water activities, there are two pools (Le Village des Meuniers campground and the Domaine des Monts du Mâconnais have each a pool).

Transport and access 

Due to its central location in France, the village takes full advantages of close infrastructures as the Route Centre-Europe Atlantique (east-west connexion road from Atlantic Ocean to Switzerland border), passing through the north of the territory. Dompierre is served by the road exit number 8 "Dompierre-les-Ormes".

Gallery

See also
 Communes of the Saône-et-Loire department
 Arboretum de Pézanin

References

Communes of Saône-et-Loire